The Hoogovens Wijk aan Zee Steel Chess Tournament 1997 was the 59th edition of the Hoogovens Wijk aan Zee Chess Tournament. It was held in Wijk aan Zee in January 1997 and was won by Valery Salov.

{| class="wikitable" style="text-align: center;"
|+ 59th Hoogovens tournament, group A, 18 January – 2 February 1997, Wijk aan Zee, Cat. XVI (2635)
! !! Player !! Rating !! 1 !! 2 !! 3 !! 4 !! 5 !! 6 !! 7 !! 8 !! 9 !! 10 !! 11 !! 12 !! 13 !! 14 !! Total !! TPR !! Place
|-
|-style="background:#ccffcc;"
| 1 || align=left| || 2665 ||  || 0 || ½ || 1 || 1 || ½ || ½ || ½ || ½ || ½ || 1 || ½ || 1 || 1 || 8½ || 2742 || 1
|-
| 2 || align="left" | || 2640 || 1 ||  || ½ || ½ || 0 || ½ || ½ || ½ || ½ || 1 || 1 || ½ || 1 || ½ || 8 || 2721 || 2–4
|-
| 3 || align="left" | || 2580 || ½ || ½ ||  || ½ || 1 || ½ || ½ || 0 || 1 || 1 || 1 || 0 || ½ || 1 || 8 || 2726 || 2–4
|-
| 4 || align="left" | || 2615 || 0 || ½ || ½ ||  || ½ || 1 || 1 || 1 || ½ || ½ || ½ || 1 || ½ || ½ || 8 || 2723 || 2–4
|-
| 5 || align="left" | || 2630 || 0 || 1 || 0 || ½ ||  || 1 || ½ || ½ || ½ || ½ || ½ || 1 || ½ || ½ || 7 || 2664 || 5
|-
| 6 || align="left" | || 2620 || ½ || ½ || ½ || 0 || 0 ||  || 0 || 1 || 1 || 1 || 1 || 0 || 1 || 0 || 6½ || 2636 || 6–7
|-
| 7 || align="left" | || 2630 || ½ || ½ || ½ || 0 || ½ || 1 ||  || ½ || ½ || ½ || 0 || 1 || 0 || 1 || 6½ || 2635 || 6–7
|-
| 8 || align="left" | || 2635 || ½ || ½ || 1 || 0 || ½ || 0 || ½ ||  || ½ || 1 || ½ || ½ || 0 || ½ || 6 || 2606 || 8–11
|-
| 9 || align="left" | || 2630 || ½ || ½ || 0 || ½ || ½ || 0 || ½ || ½ ||  || ½ || 0 || ½ || 1 || 1 || 6 || 2606 || 8–11
|-
| 10 || align="left" | || 2690 || ½ || 0 || 0 || ½ || ½ || 0 || ½ || 0 || ½ ||  || 1 || ½ || 1 || 1 || 6 || 2601 || 8–11
|-
| 11 || align="left" | || 2645 || 0 || 0 || 0 || ½ || ½ || 0 || 1 || ½ || 1 || 0 ||  || 1 || ½ || 1 || 6 || 2605 || 8–11
|- 
| 12 || align="left" | || 2635 || ½ || ½ || 1 || 0 || 0 || 1 || 0 || ½ || ½ || ½ || 0 ||  || ½ || ½ || 5½ || 2578 || 12
|-
| 13 || align="left" | || 2655 || 0 || 0 || ½ || ½ || ½ || 0 || 1 || 1 || 0 || 0 || ½ || ½ ||  || ½ || 5 || 2546 || 13
|-
| 14 || align="left" | || 2620 || 0 || ½ || 0 || ½ || ½ || 1 || 0 || ½ || 0 || 0 || 0 || ½ || ½ ||  || 4 || 2495 || 14
|}

{| class="wikitable" style="text-align: center;"
|+ 59th Hoogovens tournament, group B, 21 January – 2 February 1997, Wijk aan Zee, Cat. X (2482)
! !! Player !! Rating !! 1 !! 2 !! 3 !! 4 !! 5 !! 6 !! 7 !! 8 !! 9 !! 10 !! 11 !! 12 !! Total !! TPR !! Place
|-
| 1 || align=left| || 2555 ||  || 0 || ½ || 1 || ½ || ½ || 1 || 1 || 1 || ½ || ½ || 1 || 7½ || 2608 || 1–2
|-
| 2 || align="left" | || 2515 || 1 ||  || 0 || ½ || 1 || 0 || ½ || 1 || ½ || 1 || 1 || 1 || 7½ || 2612 || 1–2
|-
| 3 || align="left" | || 2515 || ½ || 1 ||  || ½ || 0 || ½ || ½ || ½ || 1 || 1 || ½ || ½ || 6½ || 2544 || 3–4
|-
| 4 || align="left" | || 2500 || 0 || ½ || ½ ||  || 1 || ½ || 1 || 0 || ½ || ½ || 1 || 1 || 6½ || 2545 || 3–4
|-
| 5 || align="left" | || 2555 || ½ || 0 || 1 || 0 ||  || ½ || ½ || 1 || ½ || 1 || 1 || 0 || 6 || 2511 || 5
|-
| 6 || align="left" | || 2555 || ½ || 1 || ½ || ½ || ½ ||  || 0 || ½ || ½ || ½ || 1 || 0 || 5½ || 2475 || 6–8
|-
| 7 || align="left" | || 2555 || 0 || ½ || ½ || 0 || ½ || 1 ||  || ½ || ½ || ½ || ½ || 1 || 5½ || 2475 || 6–8
|-
| 8 || align="left" | || 2455 || 0 || 0 || ½ || 1 || 0 || ½ || ½ ||  || 1 || ½ || ½ || 1 || 5½ || 2484 || 6–8
|-
| 9 || align="left" | || 2425 || 0 || ½ || 0 || ½ || ½ || ½ || ½ || 0 ||  || 1 || ½ || 1 || 5 || 2451 || 9
|-
| 10 || align="left" | || 2435 || ½ || 0 || 0 || ½ || 0 || ½ || ½ || ½ || 0 ||  ||  ½ || 1 || 4 || 2384 || 10
|-
| 11 || align="left" | || 2370 || ½ || 0 || ½ || 0 || 0 || 0 || ½ || ½ || ½ || ½ ||  || 1 || 4 || 2390 || 11
|- 
| 12 || align="left" | || 2350 || 0 || 0 || ½ || 0 || 1 || 1 || 0 || 0 || 0 || 0 || 0 ||  || 2½ || 2283 || 12
|}

References

Tata Steel Chess Tournament
1997 in chess
1997 in Dutch sport